Maeve Kelly (born 1930)  is an Irish writer.

Career
Kelly was born in Ennis, County Clare and raised in Dundalk, County Louth, Ireland. She settled in Limerick and studied nursing at St. Andrew's Hospital in London. She has written novels, short stories and poems, often dealing with women's struggle for equal rights. She received a Hennessy Lit. Award in 1972. In 1978, she founded Adapt, a Limerick shelter for battered wives.

References

External links
Maeve Kelly in 'Writers - Fiction' file at Limerick City Library, Ireland

1930 births
Living people
20th-century Irish novelists
20th-century Irish poets
Irish women short story writers
20th-century Irish short story writers
Irish women poets
People from Ennis
Irish women novelists
20th-century Irish women writers